Denver Moon is a science fiction/mystery series by Joshua Viola and Warren Hammond that consists of a novella, comic book series/graphic novel, short stories and a soundtrack. Multiple critics and review sites refer to Denver Moon as Blade Runner meets Total Recall. Denver Moon is the protagonist, a Mars-born female detective of Japanese descent, who is accompanied by her sidekick Smith, an AI merged with her late grandfather’s memories and installed in her Smith & Wesson pistol. Denver is colorblind, which plays a role in the story, as most Mars inhabitants are affected by a mysterious disease known as Red Fever. Monochromatics, such as Denver, are immune. The novella, The Minds of Mars, follows Denver as she unravels the mystery of her grandfather’s twenty-year-old death and the world-changing secrets he took to his grave that could change Mars forever.

In 2019, the comic book collection Denver Moon: Metamorphosis was included on the 2018 Bram Stoker Award Preliminary Ballot for Superior Achievement in a Graphic Novel.

Novella
Denver Moon: The Minds of Mars

Short story
"Denver Moon: Metamorphosis" is a short story prequel to the novella’s events and follows Denver as she investigates the death of multiple sex bots. The short story also inspired the 3-issue comic book series.

Comic book
The Denver Moon comic book series is a three-issue mini-series available in print and digital through comixology. A killer stalks and murders sex bots called botsies and salvages their body parts. Denver Moon investigates the case.

"Denver Moon: Murder on Mars" (Issue #1)
"Denver Moon: Rafe’s Revenge" (Issue #2)
"Denver Moon: Transformations" (Issue #3)

Graphic novel
Denver Moon: Metamorphosis collects all three comic book issues. It was included on the 2018 Bram Stoker Award Preliminary Ballot for Superior Achievement in a Graphic Novel.

Soundtrack
The Denver Moon soundtrack includes music by Klayton (a frequent collaborator of Viola), Celldweller, Scandroid, and Blue Stahli.

References

External links
IndieReader Best Reviewed Books of January 2018
Clarion Denver Moon Book Review
Publishers Weekly Denver Moon Review
BlueInk Denver Moon Book Review

2018 American novels
2018 science fiction novels
American science fiction novels